Uldis is a Latvian male given name that is a variant of the German name Ulrich, which means "powerful heritage". The name may refer to:
 Uldis Augulis (born 1972), Latvian politician
 Uldis Bērziņš (1944–2021), Latvian writer
 Uldis Briedis (born 1942), Latvian politician
 Uldis Ģērmanis (1915–1997), Latvian historian
 Uldis Osis (born 1948), Latvian economist
 Uldis Pūcītis (1937–2000), Latvian actor
 Uldis Saulīte (born 1980), Latvian rugby union footballer
 Uldis Sesks (born 1962), Latvian politician

References 

Latvian masculine given names